Earleville Wildlife Management Area is a Wildlife Management Area in Cecil County, Maryland. The area is managed as a hunting area for upland game.

References

External links
 Earleville Wildlife Management Area

Wildlife management areas of Maryland
Protected areas of Cecil County, Maryland